Sir William Marcus Gage, PC (born 22 April 1938) is a retired British judge. He was a Lord Justice of Appeal from 2004 until 18 November 2008.

Biography

Gage's father was Conolly Gage, a circuit judge. Like his father, William was educated at Repton School and Sidney Sussex College, Cambridge. He was a lieutenant in the Irish Guards during his national service.

Gage was called to the Bar in 1963 and took Silk in 1982. As a barrister, he defended Dr Ann Dally, who was disciplined by the General Medical Council for prescribing controlled drugs to addicts in the 1980s.

Gage was appointed as a High Court Judge, Queen's Bench Division in 1993 and was presiding judge in the south-eastern circuit from 1997 to 2000.

Cases he presided over include the Jill Dando murder case and the case against Sion Jenkins, a former deputy headmaster who was jailed for life in 1998 for the murder of his teenage foster daughter Billie-Jo.

After retirement, he chaired a public inquiry into the 2003 death of Baha Mousa. In his report, he condemned the use of banned interrogation methods after Mousa died of 93 injuries in British army custody in Basra, and deplored the absence of any "proper MoD doctrine on interrogation". He wrote "My judgment is that they constituted an appalling episode of serious, gratuitous violence on civilians which resulted in the death of one man and injuries to others. They represent a very serious breach of discipline by a number of members of 1QLR ."

References

1938 births
Lords Justices of Appeal
Living people
Knights Bachelor
Queen's Bench Division judges
Members of the Privy Council of the United Kingdom